Preston Heights is a census-designated place (CDP) in Will County, Illinois, United States. As of the 2020 census, the CDP population was 2,898.

Geography
Preston Heights is located at  (41.496564, -88.072573).

Demographics

2020 census

Note: the US Census treats Hispanic/Latino as an ethnic category. This table excludes Latinos from the racial categories and assigns them to a separate category. Hispanics/Latinos can be of any race.

2000 Census
As of the census of 2000, there were 2,527 people, 875 households, and 655 families residing in the CDP. The racial makeup of the CDP was 30.99% White, 63.47% African American, 0.55% Native American, 0.12% Asian, 0.20% Pacific Islander, 2.77% from other races, and 1.90% from two or more races. Hispanic or Latino of any race were 5.42% of the population.

There were 875 households, out of which 39.2% had children under the age of 18 living with them, 45.0% were married couples living together, 24.5% had a female householder with no husband present, and 25.1% were non-families. 19.9% of all households were made up of individuals, and 5.0% had someone living alone who was 65 years of age or older. The average household size was 2.89 and the average family size was 3.31.

In the CDP, the population was spread out, with 32.1% under the age of 18, 10.2% from 18 to 24, 28.3% from 25 to 44, 21.2% from 45 to 64, and 8.2% who were 65 years of age or older. The median age was 31 years. For every 100 females, there were 90.0 males. For every 100 females age 18 and over, there were 85.3 males.

The median income for a household in the CDP was $42,500, and the median income for a family was $46,331. Males had a median income of $38,875 versus $25,944 for females. The per capita income for the CDP was $18,681. About 8.6% of families and 9.7% of the population were below the poverty line, including 11.7% of those under age 18 and 8.7% of those age 65 or over.

References

Census-designated places in Will County, Illinois
Census-designated places in Illinois
Majority-minority cities and towns in Will County, Illinois